McAdam is a village located in the southwestern corner of York County, New Brunswick, Canada. An independent study was executed early 2018, and the results found that the population of McAdam had grown to 1,225. Turning the tide of a shrinking population, this is the first time the community's population grew since 1956.

The area was first settled in the mid-to-late 19th century as a group of small lumber camps. The area further developed due to its advantageous location as an important railway junction between the main line of the Canadian Pacific Railway from the Maritime provinces to New England and central Canada and branch lines to St. Stephen, St. Andrews and Woodstock.  The town was an important servicing stop for many passenger and freight trains, as well as military trains during the World Wars.  A large railway station was built to accommodate travelers and a roundhouse and yard were located in the village.  The conversion of locomotives from steam power to diesel during the 1950s, as well as highway improvements and increased trucking during the 1960s and 1970s, saw McAdam decline in importance for rail transport.  Decreased employment with the railway caused significant economic challenges for the community during the latter half of the 20th century and early 21st century.

History

Original settlement of present-day McAdam area began sometime between 1857 and 1869, after the establishment of the St. Andrews and Quebec Railway (SA&Q). McAdam began under the name of City Camp which was originally a collective of several lumbering encampments which sprung up alongside the line. By the late 1860s the European and North American Railway's "Western Extension" was completed. This line joined the SA&Q line (by now part of the New Brunswick Railway) in City Camp; as a result City Camp was renamed to McAdam Junction after John McAdam a prominent lumberman and politician, who had numerous land grants in the Canterbury Parish and Dumfries Parish parishes at that time.

By 1871 McAdam was a junction of limited importance and this contributed to a rise in population to about four hundred people, mostly railroad workers and their families. June 2, 1879, it was announced that a rail line be built to neighbouring community in Vanceboro, Maine, 10 km away. The contract was awarded for approx. $30,000. Soon after, a road was built that ran parallel to the tracks. The rail line and road remain in use today 

In 1894 the parishes of Prince William and Dumfries were merged into a new parish known as the Parish of McAdam. In 1889, the Canadian Pacific Railway (CPR) built the International Railway of Maine: the final link making it the first transcontinental railway. The following year, the CPR leased the New Brunswick Railway for nine hundred ninety-nine years. The CPR began an ambitious construction project on a massive station/hotel at the junction in 1900; construction was completed in 1901 and expanded in 1911. The station became the dominant feature of the settlement and would go on to be a major employer for the junction, heralding a period of growth.

World War I and II both had a staunch impact on the community. Trains carrying soldiers east to ports such as Halifax passed through McAdam. Trains often stopped for inspection and servicing at the station and demand for workers caused the population in the town to continue to rise. In 1915, a German agent, Werner Horn, attempted to destroy the international railroad bridge between Vanceboro, Maine and St. Croix, New Brunswick - immediately west of McAdam - in order to limit the movements of war supplies to the port of Saint John.  His attempt proved futile, as the bridge was not severely damaged and was returned to service several days later.

The change from steam locomotives to diesel locomotives during the 1950s proved to be devastating for McAdam's economy. Trains no longer needed to stop as frequently for service and the railway station in McAdam lost the importance it once had.  New highways constructed after the war saw trucks and automobiles reduce the need for the branch lines to St. Stephen, St. Andrews and Woodstock.  Local passenger trains from McAdam to these destinations were canceled in the early 1960s, leaving The Atlantic Limited as McAdam's only remaining passenger train.  These changes in turn caused the station's hotel to close later in the decade.

Already suffering from new technological developments and its isolation from any other reliable source of employment, McAdam was devastated after the CPR transferred operation of its passenger service to Via Rail Canada in 1978. In 1981, Via cancelled the Atlantic, although it was revived in 1985 before being permanently cancelled in December 1994, whereby CPR closed the station.  In January 1995, CPR transferred ownership of the building to the village at the same time as it sold its rail lines through the village to the New Brunswick Southern Railway.

Recent fundraising efforts by the village has resulted in renovations and restoration efforts for the station, which is now a museum and tourist attraction for the community. The village hosted the 2009 New Brunswick Day in an effort to generate awareness of the community's rich history.

Geography and climate 

McAdam is located in the New Brunswick Highlands.

Demographics 

The first recorded population of McAdam came from the 1901 census, recording a population of 714 people. Over the next half-century as the rail operations in McAdam expanded, the population increased substantially: a result of the promise of employment. The population peaked in 1956 at 2,803 people: nearly four times that of the 1901 census. However, with the collapse of the rail industry in the village, the employment prospects dried up. Isolated, with no new source of jobs, the population began a steady decline: a process which has continued up to the present. Fifty years since its peak population, the number of persons living in McAdam has been more than halved.

Due to community spirit and leadership, the population of McAdam grew for the first time in a generation, starting in 2018. Growth has been attributed to selling lots for $1 and the expansion of the local campground. More recently, families have been flocking to McAdam looking for a small-town rural home, while also having amenities of the city such as schools, municipal water and sewer, and also all essential shopping needs.

Economy 

McAdam's economy consists of well-rounded employment sectors, ranging from manufacturing, professional, public sector and healthcare. Tourism plays a role as well, welcoming over 30,000 visitors each year to the McAdam Train Station alone.

Manufacturing

Certainteed Gypsum 
The village's main employer is Certainteed Gypsum, which directly employs 57 employees, not including contract work, security or transportation drivers, which is believed to bring total employment to over 75 individuals. The McAdam Certainteed Gypsum plant manufactures a variety of wallboard, which is then sent to all regions of North America.

Soleno Maritimes Inc. 
Soleno Inc. produces high-density polyethylene resin pipes used for storm drains and fittings that are shipped throughout Atlantic Canada. The plant employs 25 individuals. In 2013 the New Brunswick government invested $125,000 in payroll rebates to help replace its assembly line to keep production going

Healthcare 
McAdam Health Centre, which is adjoined to Wauklehegan Manor, employs approximately 54 employees.

Entertainment

In 1965, the most watched movie in Mcadam was The Sound of Music at the Vogue Movie Theatre.  One lucky viewer saw it 42 times. This movie theatre closed in 1988.

In 1994, Eatons filmed a television commercial at the train station 3 months before national train routes stopped.

In 2016, Jonny Harris made his celebrity debut at his show at Mcadam High School on CBC’s Still Standing.

Recreation 
McAdam has a wide variety of recreation facilities that serve all ages. These facilities include, Youth Centre - Warriors Den, outdoor skating rink, tennis court, basketball court, walking trail, two gymnasiums, weight room, two baseball fields, two parks, seniors club and beach.

Notes 
  The CPR retained ownership of the station.

Notable people

 Gregory Evans - first Integrity Commissioner for the province of Ontario
 Heidi Hanlon - curler, 11-time provincial women's champion skip

See also
 List of communities in New Brunswick

References

External links 
 Official Village of McAdam Website

Villages in New Brunswick
Communities in York County, New Brunswick